John Enzmann (a.k.a. Gentleman John) (March 4, 1890 in Brooklyn, New York – March 14, 1984 in Riverhead, New York) was a pitcher in Major League Baseball.

Biography
He pitched for the 1914 Brooklyn Robins, the 1918–1919 Cleveland Indians and the 1920 Philadelphia Phillies. Following his baseball career, Enzmann worked as toolmaker from which he retired in 1972.

The Phillies celebrated the franchise's centennial in 1983 and identified Enzmann as the team's then-living oldest player. Enzmann was 93 years old and living in Ft. Lauderdale.  As part of celebrations on May 1, 1983, Enzmann threw out the first-pitch prior to the Phillies game against the Houston Astros at Veterans Stadium.

References

External links

Major League Baseball pitchers
Brooklyn Robins players
Cleveland Indians players
Philadelphia Phillies players
Minor league baseball managers
Newark Indians players
Rochester Hustlers players
Harrisburg Senators players
Milwaukee Brewers (minor league) players
Syracuse Stars (minor league baseball) players
Toronto Maple Leafs (International League) players
Reading Keystones players
Newark Bears (IL) players
Hartford Senators players
Bridgeport Bears (baseball) players
Pittsfield Hillies players
Baseball players from New York (state)
1890 births
1920 deaths